Jack Harrison (born 27 August 1916) was an English footballer who played for Port Vale in the 1930s.

Career
Harrison played for Sneyd Colliery before joining Port Vale as an amateur in May 1936, signing as a professional in August of that year. He played just two Third Division North and two cup games and left The Old Recreation Ground on a free transfer in April 1937.

Career statistics
Source:

References

1916 births
Year of death missing
English footballers
Association football wingers
Port Vale F.C. players
English Football League players